The 1930 Liège–Bastogne–Liège was the 20th edition of the Liège–Bastogne–Liège cycle race and was held on 29 May 1930. The race started and finished in Liège. The race was won by Hermann Buse.

General classification

References

1930
1930 in Belgian sport